The 2016 Neva Cup was a professional tennis tournament played on indoor hard courts. It was the 5th edition of the tournament and part of the 2016 ITF Women's Circuit, offering a total of $100,000 in prize money. It took place in Saint Petersburg, Russia, on 19–25 September 2016.

Singles main draw entrants

Seeds 

 1 Rankings as of 12 September 2016.

Other entrants 
The following player received a wildcard into the singles main draw:
  Anastasia Bukhanko
  Maria Marfutina
  Ksenia Pervak
  Polina Vinogradova

The following players received entry from the qualifying draw:
  Vesna Dolonc
  Ilona Kremen
  Alena Tarasova
  Katarina Zavatska

Champions

Singles

 Natalia Vikhlyantseva def.  Donna Vekić, 6–1, 6–2

Doubles

 Maria Marfutina /  Anna Morgina def.  Raluca Olaru /  Alena Tarasova, 6–2, 6–3

References

External links 
 2016 Neva Cup at ITFtennis.com
 Official website 

2016 ITF Women's Circuit
2016 in Russian tennis
Tennis tournaments in Russia